The MyGolfLife Open was a professional golf tournament held at Pecanwood Golf and Country Club, in Hartbeespoort, South Africa.

The tournament was introduced for the 2022 season as a co-sanctioned European Tour and Sunshine Tour event. Originally titled as the Pecanwood Classic, the name was eventually changed to the MyGolfLife Open.

Pablo Larrazábal won the inaugural event, beating Adri Arnaus and Jordan Smith in a sudden-death playoff.

Winners

Notes

References

External links
Coverage on European Tour official site

Former European Tour events
Former Sunshine Tour events
Golf tournaments in South Africa